Nuevo Sabana Yegua is a town in the Azua province of the Dominican Republic.

Sources 
 – World-Gazetteer.com

Populated places in Azua Province